The 2002 Austrian Grand Prix (formally the Grosser A1 Preis von Österreich 2002) was a Formula One motor race held on 12 May 2002 at the A1-Ring in Spielberg, Styria, Austria. It was the sixth round of the 2002 Formula One World Championship and the 25th Austrian Grand Prix as part of the Formula One World Championship. Ferrari driver Michael Schumacher won the 71-lap race starting from third position. His teammate Rubens Barrichello finished second, and Juan Pablo Montoya took third for the Williams team.

Michael Schumacher, who was the winner of four of the five preceding races in the season, led the World Drivers' Championship prior to the Grand Prix with his team Ferrari leading the World Constructors' Championship. Barrichello started the race from the pole position after recording the fastest lap in qualifying; Williams driver Ralf Schumacher started second, but was passed by Michael Schumacher in the first corner. Barrichello maintained the lead through most of the race until Ferrari invoked team orders on him to allow Michael Schumacher to win the race on the final lap and improve his standing in the World Drivers' Championship. It was his fourth victory in a row in the 2002 season and the 58th of his career. The safety car was deployed twice during the race, which included a major accident on lap 28 involving Jordan driver Takuma Sato and Nick Heidfeld of the Sauber team, who both sustained light injuries.

At the post-race podium ceremony Michael Schumacher implored Barrichello to mount the stand reserved for the race winner and gave the first-place trophy to his teammate. That led the Fédération Internationale de l'Automobile (FIA; Formula One's governing body) to fine Ferrari, Michael Schumacher and Barrichello $1 million on 26 June; each paid a third immediately, while the remainder was suspended. Following a review, the FIA banned the practice of team orders beginning with the 2003 season; they began again allowing the practice following the 2010 championship.

The win increased Michael Schumacher's lead in the World Drivers' Championship to 27 points over Montoya in second place. Ralf Schumacher came fourth to maintain third place, and Barrichello moved past David Coulthard of the McLaren team to fourth. In the World Constructors' Championship, Ferrari further extended their advantage over Williams to 16 points. McLaren were another 36 points behind in third with eleven races remaining in the season.

Background

The 2002 Austrian Grand Prix was the 6th of 17 motor races in the 2002 Formula One World Championship, and the 25th time it formed part of the championship. The 71-lap race was held at the 9-turn  A1 Ring in Spielberg, Styria, on 12 May. With very few sections requiring drivers competitors to slow down, the track gives teams an opportunity to push their engines to their full potential. 70 percent of the lap can be driven at full racing speed, although the circuit's relatively high altitude of  offers less oxygen to feed the combustion engines, reducing their performance by approximately seven percent.

Before the race, Ferrari driver Michael Schumacher led the Drivers' Championship with 44 points. Juan Pablo Montoya and Ralf Schumacher of the Williams team were second and third with 23 and 20 points, respectively. Driving for McLaren, David Coulthard was fourth with nine points, and Jenson Button for Renault was a further point behind in fifth. Ferrari led the Constructors' Championship with 50 points, seven ahead of Williams in second place. McLaren with 13 points were third, with Renault and Sauber tied for fourth with eight points apiece.

Michael Schumacher, who had won four of the opening five Grands Prix in 2002, was strongly considered by the British press, bookmakers, and former drivers Gerhard Berger and Niki Lauda the favourite to win the Austrian Grand Prix, an event he had not won in four previous attempts. He said of his chances in Austria, "We believe we have a very competitive package overall but it's a question of how good the others can be". He expressed confidence he could challenge for victory saying, "I certainly won't be approaching this race any differently than the others. And with two almost perfect races behind us, I'm obviously looking forward to the Austrian Grand Prix with a lot of confidence." Montoya stated he would be better able to challenge Ferrari at the A1-Ring recalling the team's strong form in 2001 despite scoring no points, "I am pretty confident that in Austria we will be quite strong, certainly stronger than in [the prior race in] Barcelona, so I am looking forward to it."

For the Grand Prix, a total of 11 teams (each representing a different constructor) each entered two race drivers, with no changes from the season entry list. In technical developments, Sauber introduced a revised evolution of its Ferrari 050 engine that the team had used in the first five races of the 2002 championship. The team installed a new aerodynamic package that included a revised undertray, front wing and altered bodywork around the cover of the C21's engine. The Ferrari, McLaren and Williams teams brought new front brake air intakes. Williams also used an upgraded front wing on its FW24, which was characterised by a curved profile.

Practice
There were four practice sessions preceding Sunday's race, two one-hour sessions on Friday and two 45-minute sessions on Saturday. The first practice session was held in cool and overcast weather. Michael Schumacher was fastest with a lap of 1 minute, 11.072 seconds with approximately ten minutes remaining. His teammate Barrichello, Felipe Massa and Nick Heidfeld of Sauber, Jordan drivers Giancarlo Fisichella and Takuma Sato, Coulthard, Arrows' Heinz-Harald Frentzen, and the British American Racing (BAR) duo of Jacques Villeneuve and Olivier Panis, were second through tenth. Some drivers—including Barrichello, Massa and Fisichella—ran off the dusty, slippery track into a gravel trap during the session because of a low amount of grip; none sustained damage to their vehicles.

Conditions became warmer and sunnier for the second practice session though rainfall threatened towards the end. The fastest times were recorded within the first 20 minutes since the track temperature was at its warmest. Barrichello set the day's fastest lap, at 1 minute, 10.549 seconds. His teammate Michael Schumacher was three-hundredths of a second slower in second position. Montoya, Kimi Räikkönen of the McLaren team, Allan McNish for Toyota, Arrows driver Enrique Bernoldi, Jaguar's Pedro de la Rosa, Panis, Coulthard and Sato were third to tenth. Some drivers, including Michael and Ralf Schumacher, and McNish, again lost control of their cars and ran off to the side of the track during the session. Heidfeld's track time was curtailed after 20 minutes due to an alternator fault. Frentzen lost a quarter of an hour to familiarise himself with the track after he spun over a kerb and damaged his car's undertray.

The third practice session took place in clear and dry weather; no drivers ventured off the less slippery circuit. Michael Schumacher used low track and ambient temperatures to become the first driver to go below 70 seconds all weekend with a lap of 1 minute, 9.001 seconds that he recorded half an hour in. His teammate Barrichello was second-fastest and Räikkönen third. Frentzen, Massa, Coulthard, Heidfeld, Panis, Button and Bernoldi followed in positions four through ten.

The ambient and track temperatures had increased by the start of the fourth practice session. Several competitors made driver errors sending them into the gravel. Michael Schumacher set the track lap record of 1 minute, 8.433 seconds. Barrichello was second, and Ralf Schumacher improved to third. Montoya, Frentzen, Massa, Heidfeld, Räikkönen, Panis and Villeneuve completed the top ten. Bernoldi missed 25 minutes due to a malfunctioning gearbox. He later lost control of the rear of his car at turn two and got beached in a gravel trap before the session ended.

Qualifying

Saturday's afternoon one-hour qualifying session saw each competitor limited to twelve laps, with the starting order decided by their fastest laps. The 107% rule was in effect during this session, requiring each driver set a time within 107 per cent of the quickest lap to qualify for the race. Conditions were clear with warm air and track temperatures. Barrichello took his second pole position of the season and the fifth of his career with a lap of 1 minute, 8.082 seconds. He was joined on the grid's front row by Ralf Schumacher, who took his best starting position of the year. Michael Schumacher was third; he said he lost speed due to a brake problem, and traffic slowed him. He switched to the spare Ferrari for his final timed lap in an unsuccessful attempt to claim pole position, and did not earn a front-row start for the first time since the 2001 Italian Grand Prix eight races earlier. A misfiring engine prompted Montoya in fourth to switch to the spare car setup for his teammate Ralf Schumacher; he made a minor tyre-pressure adjustment to record his fastest lap. Heidfeld took fifth, claiming he could have improved had Button not slowed his final timed lap. A lack of speed restricted the McLaren duo of Räikkönen and Coulthard to sixth and eighth; they were separated by Massa who made two driver errors in an unbalanced car through high-speed turns. Panis was ninth-fastest as de la Rosa slowed his final timed lap. Toyota's Mika Salo in tenth had a minor understeer.

Frentzen in 11th spun on oil and removed some bodywork components from his car in a gravel trap. His vehicle was later repaired to continue driving. His Arrows' teammate Bernoldi followed in 12th and expressed satisfaction with his car's balance. Traffic slowed Button on his four timed laps and left him 13th. McNish and Toyota located a car setup tailored to suit him, and took 14th. Fisichella ran a new engine in qualifying and took 15th with a car setup suited for used front and new rear tyres. Jarno Trulli had a major engine failure through turn nine and lost control of his Renault on oil. The session was stopped for 11 minutes for track marshals to dry the oil. Trulli returned to the garage and used the spare Renault setup for his teammate Button and took 16th after minor braking problems. Villeneuve used a new set of tyres for qualifying; he was uncomfortable with his car's setup and was 17th. A handling imbalance created an unbalanced car for Sato in 18th. Jaguar's de la Rosa and Eddie Irvine filled the grid's tenth row: de la Rosa had a rear suspension fault caused by an exhaust overheating it and Irvine removed his front wing in a collision with the rear of Bernoldi's vehicle into turn one. Minardi drivers Mark Webber and Alex Yoong started from the eleventh row: Webber optimised his PS02's balance so it ran without any issues on its tyres during the session, and intermittent rear brake locking destabilised Yoong's car causing him to spin after leaving the pit lane.

Qualifying classification

Warm-up

A half-hour warm-up session took place on Sunday morning, in clear and warm weather. All drivers fine-tuned their race setups for the weather and drove their spare cars. Barrichello had the fastest lap of 1 minute and 10.876 seconds and his teammate Michael Schumacher was second. Massa, Frentzen, Heidfeld, Bernoldi, Coulthard, Villeneuve, Räikkönen and Irvine completed the top ten. While the session saw no major incidents, Ralf Schumacher entered the gravel traps at the two of the track's corners.

After the warm-up session, Montoya predicted several drivers would run wide on a rumble strip located to the outside of the circuit, which extended from turn one to the first portion of the straight driving towards turn two, to increase the top speed of their cars. Ron Dennis, the team principal of McLaren, argued Ferrari should allow their drivers to race each other without the imposition of team orders favouring one driver over the other as had happened in the 2001 race.

Race
The race began at 14:00 local time. The weather was clear and dry. Barrichello made a brisk start to maintain the lead into the first turn. While he provided room for drivers to pass him, none did. Behind Barrichello, his teammate Michael Schumacher made a fast start to slot into second position and Heidfeld rose from fifth to third having overtaken Ralf Schumacher on the outside. Räikkönen and Massa, meanwhile, drew alongside and Massa steered onto the grass dropping to tenth. Further back, Bernoldi made contact with the rear of his teammate Frentzen; both cars continued as Bernoldi entered the pit lane after the first lap. At turn two, an increase in speed led de la Rosa's throttle pick-up to start to cut out. He slowed, and retired in the pit lane at the end of the lap. In the meantime, Villeneuve experienced a minor loss of car control and hit Frentzen's car on the inside. The collision sent Frentzen into a gravel trap from which he slowly extricated himself.

At the end of the first lap, Barrichello led his teammate Michael Schumacher, Heidfeld, Ralf Schumacher, Montoya and Coulthard. Heidfeld ran wide at Castrol Kurve at the beginning of the second lap and the Williams pair of Ralf Schumacher and Montoya demoted him to fifth. Barrichello and Michael Schumacher began to pull away from the rest of the field. There were overtakes further down the field. On lap two, Salo passed Button for eighth. Villeneuve overtook his teammate Panis for 14th position and Frentzen passed Webber on lap three. During the next lap Yoong lost two places to his teammate Webber, and Frentzen. Bernoldi retired from the race with a broken front wing and front brake pipe. Räikkönen in seventh retired at the side of the track with an engine failure on lap six. On lap seven Villeneuve passed McNish for tenth place, then ran wide. He made a second, successful attempt on the eighth lap, passing McNish who opted against a challenge.

That same lap, Massa entered the pit lane to join the list of retirees with a failed left-rear suspension; it failed in turn two, causing the Sauber C21's right-front wheel to lift from the tarmac surface and its undertray to scrape along it. Villeneuve made a pass on Fisichella for ninth place on lap ten. Not long after Villeneuve overtook Button for eighth position. By the same lap, Barrichello led by a second over his teammate Michael Schumacher, who in turn was 17 seconds ahead of Ralf Schumacher. Further down the order, Frentzen put a rear wheel on the grass at the final corner on lap 16. He lost control of his car, spun through 180 degrees and rolled backwards in front of the race leaders. Frentzen fell to 18th position, behind the Minardi cars of Webber and Yoong. He passed Yoong to return to 17th position on the 18th lap. One lap later, Villeneuve overtook Salo on the inside for seventh place and blocked Salo's attempted counter-move.

As the Ferraris extended their lead over Ralf Schumacher, the stewards informed the BAR team on the 23rd lap Villeneuve had incurred a drive-through penalty as they deemed him at fault for the collision with Frentzen on lap one. Lap 24 saw the safety car's first deployment by the race director: Panis' engine seized without warning on the start/finish straight. His rear wheels locked, spun to the centre of the track and avoided hitting the barrier. Track marshals removed Panis' car from the circuit as he returned to the pit lane. The Ferrari and Williams' teams employed different pit stop strategies—the Ferrari team planned for two stops whereas the Williams team planned one. The Ferrari team called Barrichello and Michael Schumacher into the pit lane for their first pit stops; Schumacher drove more slowly than Barrichello to allow their mechanics to service the latter's car first. Barrichello retained the lead as Michael Schumacher yielded second to Ralf Schumacher. The safety car was withdrawn at the conclusion of the 27th lap and Barrichello led at the restart.

Soon after, a major accident prompted the safety car's second deployment on lap 28. Montoya on the inside was about to lap Sato's slower car at turn two, with the latter ahead at the apex. At high speed, Heidfeld narrowly avoided hitting Montoya's front wing, and the rear of his Sauber sustained a side collision against the right-hand sidepod of Sato's car, causing heavy damage to both vehicles and littering carbon fibre and titanium debris over a wide area of track. Heidfeld's rear structure and titanium gearbox punctured a hole in Sato's car; his knees struck the steering column breaking it in half. Both drivers were sent into a gravel trap and came to a stop there.

A visibly shaken Heidfeld was extricated from his car by track marshals with a heavily bruised left leg. After Sato's car absorbed enough energy in the accident, he remained in it with soft-tissue damage to his right thigh, but did not lose consciousness; a section of the Sauber's rear crash structure penetrated the side of the Jordan's monocoque just below Sato's right knee and his helmet was squeezed between the car's head restraint, both of which stopped him leaving his car. The Fédération Internationale de l'Automobile (FIA, Formula One's governing body) safety and medical delegate Sid Watkins and his team took ten minutes to remove Sato from the car and treated him at the crash site before transporting him by ambulance to the track's medical centre. From there, Sato and Heidfeld were flown by helicopter to Graz University Hospital, for overnight observation and precautionary x-ray scans. Under safety car conditions, every team apart from Ferrari and Williams brought their drivers to the pit lane for additional fuel and a set of tyres. After 20 minutes, the race restarted at lap 36's end when the safety car entered the pit lane. Barrichello led Ralf Schumacher, Michael Schumacher, Montoya, Coulthard and Fisichella. On lap 37, Webber passed his teammate Yoong for 13th.

Villeneuve passed Fisichella for sixth place at the start of the 38th lap. On the same lap, Irvine entered the pit lane to retire with hydraulics failure. Two laps later, Villeneuve caught and overtook Coulthard at turn one for fifth. Coulthard lost sixth place to Fisichella after driving on oil and off the circuit on the 45th lap. On the same lap Trulli pulled over at the end of the pit lane wall on the main straight to retire from with a loss of fuel pressure. Yoong retired with fire visible from the rear of his Minardi soon after. Green flag pit stops began on lap 47. Ralf Schumacher made a pit stop and dropped to fifth position. His teammate Montoya remained on the track for another four laps and used more fuel in an attempt to overtake Ralf Schumacher. Montoya entered the pit lane for tyres on the 51st lap. He returned to the race in fourth position, ahead of his teammate Ralf Schumacher. Villeneuve was elevated to third position until a pit stop on lap 53 demoted him to ninth. Montoya and Ralf Schumacher returned to third and fourth respectively.

Barrichello entered the pit lane for the second time on the 61st lap. His fuel stop took 6.2 seconds and he exited in second place. His teammate Michael Schumacher led lap 62 and made his second pit stop at the end of the lap. He returned to the race in second position; Barrichello returned to first. On the 63rd lap, Ferrari team principal Jean Todt invoked team orders on Barrichello to relinquish the victory to his teammate Michael Schumacher. This would improve Schumacher's position in the World Drivers' Championship with a win earning him ten points. Ferrari advised Barrichello they would terminate his contract if he failed to do so. Barrichello radioed Todt of a promise he made not to relinquish a victory to a driver. This prompted Todt to reply to Barrichello he was required to obey his instruction in order to preserve Ferrari's "best interests". Personnel on the Ferrari pit gantry observed the television screens and noticed Michael Schumacher could not get close enough to pass Barrichello in the final seven laps.

At the start of the final lap, Barrichello led his teammate Michael Schumacher by one second. As Barrichello entered the final corner, Ferrari technical director Ross Brawn informed Michael Schumacher over the radio his teammate would yield to him. When Barrichello braked in the final  to comply with Ferrari's instruction, Michael Schumacher slowed more than his teammate because he had hoped that no team orders would be applied. Barrichello was 0.182 seconds behind in second position with Montoya 17.7 seconds adrift in third. Montoya's teammate Ralf Schumacher finished in fourth place. Fisichella was fifth and took the first two points of the season for the Jordan team. Coulthard took the final point in sixth position, ahead of Button's Renault and the Toyota cars of Salo and McNish. A loss of hydraulic pressure caused Villeneuve's engine to fail on the final lap; he was classified tenth. Frentzen and Webber for the Arrows and Minardi teams were the final finishers, albeit two laps behind the race winner.

Post-race
The Ferrari team were booed, jeered, whistled at and given a thumbs down signal by the crowd in parc fermé and on the podium. Michael Schumacher insisted Barrichello mount the first step on the podium, as "Deutschlandlied" was played. Schumacher then stood beside his teammate when Il Canto degli Italiani played. Wolfgang Schüssel, the Chancellor of Austria, presented the winner's trophy to Schumacher who proceeded to give it to Barrichello. Barrichello's race engineer Gabriele Delli Colli joined him on the podium to receive the winning manufacturer's award. Later, in the press conference, where loud boos were heard, Barrichello said of the situation, "I'm going through a period of a very good time of my life. I'm becoming a better person, a better driver, so there's no point in arguing. I think my determination will bring me a lot more wins, so that's the way I see it, so there's no point arguing." Michael Schumacher said he understood Ferrari's decision, "the team is investing a lot of money for one sort of target and imagine in the end it wouldn't be enough by this amount of points, how stupid would we look?" Montoya said the two safety car periods allowed him to pass his teammate Ralf Schumacher, "Ralf was quite quick out of the pits as well, but I managed to get a few laps in really quick right before the stop and that was enough."

Sato and Heidfeld were deemed fit to compete at the Monaco Grand Prix held two weeks later after passing fitness tests. Sid Watkins told Eddie Jordan, the owner of the Jordan team, that Sato had "a miraculous escape", leading Jordan to remark, "Somebody up there likes him". Sato said he had not observed Heidfeld approaching him, "When I opened my eyes I could see my legs were squashed by the damaged monocoque and I could see the ground through the hole. Although there was some pain, I knew nothing was broken. The car did a great job of saving me – I hear there was nothing left of it." Heidfeld admitted he was at fault for causing the crash, "I saw a cloud of tyre smoke as [Alex] Yoong braked really hard and early ahead of us, and maybe I pressed the pedal too hard as a result while the brakes were still cool. The car got away from me and next thing I knew I was going backwards down the grass." That the injuries Sato sustained in the accident were minor was cited as a consequence of improved safety standards undertaken by the FIA, racing teams and medical experts since the 1970s.

Ralf Schumacher praised his car for allowing him to finish fourth, "Due to the action packed race and the different strategies it is difficult to say how big Ferrari's advantage really was here on the A1-Ring. We have to continue to work hard, this much is clear." Fisichella commented on his fifth-place finish, "It's been a very, very good day for me, as I didn't expect to score points. But, the most important thing is that Takuma is alright. It felt fantastic when I crossed the line and I would like to say thank you to the team, especially because we made the right pit stop decision." The race result increased Michael Schumacher's lead in the Drivers' Championship to 27 points over Montoya in second. Ralf Schumacher was third with 23 points. Barrichello overtook Coulthard for fourth with 12 points. In the Constructors' Championship, Ferrari further extended their advantage over the Williams team to 16 points. McLaren maintained third position with 14 points. The Renault and Sauber teams continued to hold fourth and fifth places with eleven races left in the season.

Team orders
Ferrari's use of team orders to determine the finishing order overshadowed the race. Reuters cited it as the most "particularly blatant" application of team orders applied to favour one driver over another since Coulthard relinquished first position to his McLaren teammate Mika Häkkinen in the final laps of the 1998 Australian Grand Prix to comply with a prior agreement. Australian commentator Darrell Eastlake, despite being a supporter of Ferrari and Michael Schumacher, claimed that it was the "most bloody disgraceful thing I've ever seen in my life" and Schumacher "should have had the balls to move aside and let Barrichello win".

Ferrari were heavily condemned by fans on the internet, some members of the Formula One community, the world press, and President Fernando Henrique Cardoso of Brazil. Some Formula One figures held different views, including the Williams pair of Montoya and Ralf Schumacher as well as Irvine, who all stated their belief Michael Schumacher should not be apportioned blame for winning the Grand Prix through team orders. Jody Scheckter, the 1979 world champion and Ron Dennis defended Ferrari's application of team orders as a means of enhancing Michael Schumacher's position in the championship.

The day after the race, the FIA summoned Ferrari and its drivers to a meeting of the FIA World Motor Sport Council in Paris on 26 June to explain why the team ordered Barrichello to yield the victory to Michael Schumacher and their actions on the podium. At a press conference on 24 May, FIA president Max Mosley stated while Ferrari had not transgressed the regulations concerning team orders, the meeting would establish the appropriate punishment in the event a panel deemed if any rules were broken, "There are rules about interfering with competition but we established a long time ago that team orders are allowed." That same day, Mosley said on the FIA's behalf he wrote a letter of apology to Schüssel.

At the meeting, the FIA deemed Ferrari to have transgressed series regulations when Michael Schumacher chose not to mount the first position on the podium and handed the trophy given to him by the Chancellor of Austria to his teammate Barrichello. The council also determined the team had not committed any violation when it invoked team orders on Barrichello to relinquish the victory to Michael Schumacher. It imposed a fine of $1 million on Ferrari, Michael Schumacher and Barrichello, half of which was paid immediately and divided into equal amounts between the trio; the remainder was suspended for one year on the condition a similar offence did not occur. Neither a points deduction nor a race ban were imposed.

In response Mosley established a four-member working group to discuss team orders and invited the public to lend their opinion on the practice on the FIA's website. The FIA accepted feedback from 5 July to 1 September, which was passed on to the working group. They reviewed it and gave their recommendations to the governing body. At a meeting of the 26-member Formula One Commission on 28 October, it was confirmed "team orders that interfere with the race result" would be barred from the 2003 season onwards. Thereafter, teams employed coded messages to loophole the rule on team orders. During the 2010 German Grand Prix, Ferrari employed a "coded message" to invoke team orders allowing driver Fernando Alonso to pass Massa and win the race. The parallels between how Michael Schumacher and Alonso won those races was the catalyst of the FIA rescinding the regulation barring team orders because it was deemed difficult to enforce.

Todt admitted to La Stampa in December 2010 he should have avoided invoking team orders on Barrichello due to his subsequent belief Michael Schumacher would have won the championship without significant competition. Brawn reiterated Todt's opinion to British magazine Autosport seven years later and stated the negative consequences for Formula One outweighed the positives, calling it "on reflection ... it was a mistake."

Race classification
Drivers who scored championship points are denoted in bold.

Championship standings after the race

Drivers' Championship standings

Constructors' Championship standings

Note: Only the top five positions are included for both sets of standings.

Footnotes

References

External links
 Official 2002 Austrian Grand Prix results from FIA website  and Formula1 website.
 Formula One Database > 2002 Austrian Grand Prix – Qualifying 

Austrian Grand Prix
Grand Prix
Austrian Grand Prix
May 2002 sports events in Europe
Formula One controversies